The "Canadian Caper" was the joint covert rescue by the Canadian government and the CIA of six American diplomats who had evaded capture during the seizure of the United States embassy in Tehran, Iran, on November 4, 1979, after the Iranian Revolution, when Islamist students took most of the American embassy personnel hostage, demanding the return of the US-backed Shah for trial.

After the diplomats had been sheltered by the British mission and Canadian diplomatic personnel, the Canadian and United States governments worked on a strategy to gain their escape through subterfuge and use of Canadian passports. The "caper" involved a CIA officer (Tony Mendez and his colleague known as "Julio" for this event) joining the six diplomats in Tehran to form a fake film crew. It was purportedly made up of six Canadians, one Irishman and one Latin American, who were finishing scouting for an appropriate location to shoot a scene for the science-fiction film Argo, production of which had in fact been abandoned. On the morning of Sunday, January 27, 1980, the full eight-person party passed through passport control, at the Mehrabad Airport in Tehran, boarded a Swissair flight to Zürich and escaped Iran.

An article written about these events was published in Wired in 2007. The article was used loosely—alongside a memoir Mendez wrote—as the basis of the 2012 film Argo.

Background

When the Islamic Iranian Revolution occurred, the US-backed Shah of Iran, Mohammad Reza Pahlavi, fled the country. Amid the turmoil, a mob of young Islamists, known as the Muslim Student Followers of the Imam's Line, stormed the US Embassy in Tehran on November 4, 1979, capturing dozens of diplomats and holding them hostage. They demanded the return of the Shah to Iran for trial. The provisional government fell shortly thereafter, when Prime Minister Mehdi Bazargan and his cabinet resigned. 

Although the new Iranian government stated that the hostage-takers were students acting on their own, it joined in demands for the return of the Shah. Most of the hostages were held until early 1981.

Sanctuary for diplomats
Robert Anders, Cora Amburn-Lijek, Mark Lijek, Joseph Stafford, Kathleen Stafford and Lee Schatz were the six American diplomats who were harboured by Canadian diplomats Ken Taylor and John Sheardown and exfiltrated from Tehran in 1980. They were working in the consulate, a separate building in the embassy compound, when the Iranians came over the wall. Two groups of diplomats fled into Tehran's streets with orders to walk to the British Embassy: The Anders group (excluding Schatz), along with two Americans seeking consular services (including Kim King, who later had a local embassy employee help him obtain an exit visa and fly out of Iran); and the second group, including Consul General Richard Morefield. The latter took an indirect route and were soon captured and returned to the compound. The Anders group neared the British embassy, but saw a huge crowd staging a protest in their path. Robert Anders invited the others to his home, as he lived nearby.

Over a six-day odyssey, the Anders group, aided by Thai cook Somchai "Sam" Sriweawnetr, went from house to house, including one night spent at the British residential compound. After three days, the Bazargan government fell, and the diplomats realized the ordeal would not be over quickly. Looking for options, Anders contacted his old friend John Sheardown, a Canadian immigration officer, and received an enthusiastic invitation for the entire group. On November 10, five from the original Anders group (Anders, the Lijeks and the Staffords) arrived at the Sheardown residence. In addition to seeing John and Zena Sheardown, they were greeted by Canadian Ambassador Ken Taylor. The Staffords were taken by Taylor to his home, where they joined his wife Pat. The other three stayed with the Sheardowns. They were sheltered by the two Canadian households for a total of 79 days. On November 27, Taylor received a call from the Swedish ambassador Kaj Sundberg, asking him to take in American Lee Schatz. Schatz had initially slept on the floor at the Swedish embassy and later stayed at the apartment of Swedish consul Cecilia Lithander. However, the Swedish ambassador felt he could better impersonate a Canadian. Taylor agreed, and placed Schatz in the Sheardown residence.
 
The Canadians had taken great personal risks in sheltering the Americans, giving refuge in their private homes to the six American diplomats who were in danger.  Two "friendly-country" embassy officials assisted as well, and an unoccupied diplomatic residence was used for several weeks.

Taylor contacted Flora MacDonald, Canadian Secretary of State for External Affairs, and Canadian Prime Minister Joe Clark for assistance. They expressed support for the sheltering effort. They decided to smuggle the six Americans out of Iran on an international flight by using Canadian passports for them. To do so, an Order in Council was made to issue official multiple copies of Canadian passports, with various fake identities, to the American diplomats in Canadian sanctuary. The passports that were issued contained a set of forged Iranian visas prepared by the US Central Intelligence Agency to be used in an attempt to escape from Iran.

Preparation
The CIA enlisted its disguise and exfiltration expert, Tony Mendez, to provide a cover story, documents, appropriate clothing, and materials to change their appearances. Mendez worked closely with Canadian government staff in Ottawa, who forwarded the passports and other supporting material to the Canadian embassy through a Canadian diplomatic courier. Mendez flew to Tehran with an associate known as "Julio" to assist with the rescue. Julio and Mendez had previously worked together in the CIA's Office of Technical Service (OTS) branch.

Alternative passports and identities had been prepared for a variety of scenarios, but the cover story selected had the six as Canadians working on a Hollywood crew scouting movie locations. The elaborate back-story concerned a film named Argo, based on the 1967 Roger Zelazny science fiction novel Lord of Light. The original Lord of Light project, produced by Barry Geller and starring Rosey Grier, had been abandoned before the start of filming after funds were embezzled; concept art by Jack Kirby existed, and the script was set on a planet with a Middle-Eastern feel, which the team could use to justify their desire to scout locations in Iran.

To make the cover believable, Mendez enlisted the help of John Chambers, a veteran Hollywood make-up artist. They established a functioning office at Sunset Gower Studios on Sunset Boulevard, named "Studio Six Productions" (a nod to the six diplomats). It used office space that actor Michael Douglas had recently used while making the film The China Syndrome (1979). Telephone calls to the "Studio Six" office in Los Angeles would be answered, should anyone call to check on the film's production. Display ads for the upcoming "Studio Six" film were placed in Hollywood publications, and one such newspaper was given to Cora Lijek to carry as part of her cover materials. The team also prepared fake business cards, held a film party at a nightclub in Los Angeles, and took out early advertisements for the film in Variety and The Hollywood Reporter industry magazines. Robert Sidell, a friend of Chambers and also a makeup artist, posed as a film producer at related events, while his wife Joan performed as the receptionist at "Studio Six". Chambers was later awarded CIA's Intelligence Medal of Merit for his help in the operation.

A mistake was made in dating the visas, as the Iranian year begins at the spring equinox. One of the Canadian embassy officers spotted the mistake while checking the documents. Fortunately, extra passports had been included, so Mendez was able to insert new visa stamps with dates based on the Iranian calendar. As the weeks passed during this preparation, the American diplomats read and played games, mainly cards and Scrabble. Taylor worked to fly out non-essential Canadian embassy personnel. Taylor sent others on fake errands, both to establish erratic patterns and to case airport procedures. Tension rose as suspicious telephone calls and other activity indicated that the concealment of the diplomats might have been discovered.

Rescue
Early on the morning of Sunday, January 27, 1980, Mendez, "Julio", and the six American diplomats, traveling with real Canadian passports and forged entry documents, easily made it through security at Tehran's Mehrabad International Airport. After a short delay because of mechanical difficulties with the McDonnell Douglas DC-8-62, the group boarded Swissair flight 363 (Registration: HB-IDL) for Zürich, Switzerland. By coincidence, the aircraft was named Aargau, after the Aargau canton in northern Switzerland. Upon landing in Zürich, the six diplomats were taken by CIA operatives to a mountain lodge safe house for the night. There, they were told that, for diplomatic purposes, they would not be able to talk to the press and that they would be kept hidden in a secret location in Florida until the hostage situation was resolved. Mendez and Julio continued to Frankfurt, Germany, where Mendez wrote his after-action report. 

The next day, the story broke in Montreal, in an article written by Jean Pelletier, Washington correspondent for La Presse; it was quickly picked up by the international press. The CIA drove the six diplomats from Switzerland to the US Ramstein Air Base in West Germany to be flown across the Atlantic to Dover Air Force Base in Delaware.

The eight Americans in the "caper" left Iran on Sunday, January 27. The Canadians closed their embassy the same day. Ambassador Taylor and the remaining staff returned to Canada. The six American diplomats arrived in the United States on January 30, 1980.

The six rescued American diplomats:
 Robert G. Anders, 54 – consular officer
 Mark J. Lijek, 29 – consular officer
 Cora A. Lijek, 25 – consular assistant
 Henry L. Schatz, 31 – agricultural attaché
 Joseph D. Stafford, 29 – consular officer
 Kathleen F. Stafford, 28 – consular assistant

The Canadians involved in the rescue were appointed to the Order of Canada, Canada's second-highest civilian award. They included:

 Ambassador Taylor and his wife Patricia Taylor 
 Immigration officer John and his wife Zena Sheardown
 Mary Catherine O'Flaherty – communications officer
 Roger Lucy – political officer and first secretary for the Canadian Embassy.
 Laverna Katie Dollimore – personal secretary for Ambassador Taylor

Zena Sheardown, a British subject born in Guyana, would normally have been ineligible for the Order. Flora MacDonald intervened to ensure that she was awarded honorary membership, later converted to full membership when she became a Canadian citizen. Ambassador Taylor was subsequently awarded the Congressional Gold Medal by the United States Congress for his critical assistance to the United States.

Pelletier had uncovered some of the facts concerning the escaped diplomats before January 28, 1980, but he did not publish the story. He knew the safety of those involved had to be preserved, although there was great news value to the paper and writer. Several other news organizations also possessed some elements of the story. Pelletier's article ran on January 29 as soon as he knew the hostages had left Iran. But his exposure of the operation resulted in the US having to end their plans to house the six Americans secretly while the hostage drama continued. The Argo story was blown, but the CIA's role was kept secret by both the US and Canadian governments at the time. They wanted to ensure the safety of the remaining hostages. The CIA's full involvement was not revealed until 1997, when records were declassified.

President Jimmy Carter had officially maintained for negotiation purposes that all of the missing American diplomats were held hostage, so the news about six being rescued came as a complete surprise to the public. American gratitude for the Canadians' actions was displayed widely and by numerous American television figures and ordinary citizens alike, who particularly recognized Taylor for gratitude. The Canadian flag was flown in many locations across the United States, and ads were taken out on "Thank You" billboards.

In popular culture
In 1981, a television movie about the Canadian Caper was made, Escape from Iran: The Canadian Caper, directed by Lamont Johnson, with Kenneth D. Taylor played by Gordon Pinsent. The movie was filmed in and around Toronto, and was an American-Canadian co-production. A children's illustrated book about the event was written by 2013 Eric Hoffer Award–winner Laura Scandiffio and Stephen MacEachern, entitled Escapes! 
 
The critically and commercially successful film Argo, based on this event, was released in North American cinemas on October 12, 2012. In the film, the role of John Sheardown and his wife Zena were omitted for reasons of length and cost. The film includes elements of both fact and fiction. In particular, the film focuses largely on the role the CIA played in the operation and minimizes the extended involvement of the Canadians, and their share of strategy and preparation. Former President Jimmy Carter acknowledged this in an interview in 2013, while also praising the film. In addition, the film incorrectly states that the six American diplomats had been turned away by the British and New Zealand embassies. The American diplomats spent one night in a British diplomatic compound before it became obvious that the militants were searching for the diplomats and had confronted the British embassy. All of the diplomats involved agreed that the residence of the Canadian Ambassador would be better suited to sheltering them. Argo won three Oscars, including Best Picture, at the 85th Academy Awards on February 24, 2013.

Historian Robert Wright also covered these events in his book Our Man in Tehran (2010). A companion documentary film of the same title was released in 2013. National Geographic also featured the story in its popular television series Banged up Abroad under the title "Argo".

References

Further reading
 
 
Media

External links

Ken Taylor and the Canadian Caper — from Foreign Affairs Canada

Conflicts in 1980
Hostage rescue operations
Canada–Iran relations
Canada–United States relations
Iran–United States relations
Central Intelligence Agency operations
Iran hostage crisis
January 1980 events in Asia
CIA activities in Iran
Presidency of Jimmy Carter